The 2006–07 Ukrainian Second League was the 16th season of 3rd level professional football in Ukraine. The competitions were divided into two groups – A and B. This was a consolidation of the Second League from three groups in the previous season to two, due to the number of team withdrawal.

Team changes

Newly admitted 
The following team was promoted from the 2006 Ukrainian Football Amateur League:
 FC Lokomotyv Dvorichna – (debut)

The 2005 Ukrainian Football Amateur League participant:
 FC Feniks-Illichivets Kalinine – (debut)

Relegated from the First League 
 none

Renamed 
 FC Inter Boyarka before the start of the season changed its name from FC Boyarka-2006

Group A

Location map

Standings

Top goalscorers

Group B

Location map

Standings

Top goalscorers

See also 
 2006–07 Ukrainian Premier League
 2006–07 Ukrainian First League
 2006–07 Ukrainian Cup

References 

Ukrainian Second League seasons
3
Ukra